Funariales is an order containing 356 species,26 genera and 7 families.

1.Gigaspermaceae 2.Funariaceae 

3. Disceliaceae 4.Oedipodiacea

5. Splachaceae 6.Ephemeraceae

7. Splachnobryaceae

The members are small,annual or biennial land mosses.

Families

The order contains 7 families:

 Funariaceae (ca. 300 species)

The family Disceliaceae and its only species, Discelium nudum, was formerly placed in this order, but is now placed in its own order, Disceliales.

References

 
Moss orders
Monotypic plant orders